Thresa "Terry" Meza (born August 1, 1949) is an American politician and attorney serving as a member of the Texas House of Representatives from the 105th district.

Early life and education 
Born in Oak Cliff, Dallas, she was raised in Irving, Texas and attended Irving High School. She earned a Bachelor of Arts degree from the University of Texas at Arlington and a Juris Doctor from the Texas Wesleyan University School of Law (now Texas A&M University School of Law).

Career 
Prior to serving in the Texas House of Representatives, Meza worked as a teacher at South Grand Prairie High School and operated an independent legal practice. Meza was elected to the House in 2018, defeating incumbent Republican Rodney Anderson. She is a member of the Democratic Party. In 2020, Meza introduced HB196, a bill to modify Texas' "Castle Doctrine" to require homeowners to retreat into their own homes if it can safely be done rather than using deadly force against those who are stealing property from outside their home.

References 

Living people
1949 births
People from Dallas
People from Irving, Texas
21st-century American politicians
21st-century American women politicians
Women state legislators in Texas
Democratic Party members of the Texas House of Representatives
People from Oak Cliff, Texas